Dhanraj Gurung is a Nepali politician belonging to Nepali Congress. He's the newly elected vice president of the ruling party. He's also a former constituent assembly member.

Gurung has served as the president of Nepal Student Union, the student wing of Nepali Congress for a brief period.

References 

Living people
Nepali Congress politicians from Gandaki Province
Gurung people
Nepal MPs 2022–present
Members of the 1st Nepalese Constituent Assembly
Members of the 2nd Nepalese Constituent Assembly
1966 births